El Paso Community College (EPCC) is a community college district headquartered in El Paso, Texas, United States.  EPCC operates five campuses in the Greater El Paso area, as well as courses offered at nearby Fort Bliss.

As defined by the Texas Legislature, the official service area of EPCC is all of El Paso and Hudspeth counties in Texas.

Athletics
El Paso Community College is a member of the National Junior College Athletic Association competing in Region V and the Western Junior College Athletic Conference.
EPCC's sports teams are known as the Tejanos. They compete in baseball, softball, and cross country running. The baseball team plays at EPCC Baseball Stadium.

EPCC Baseball Stadium
EPCC Baseball Stadium is a baseball venue located in El Paso, Texas and the home of the El Paso Community College Tejanos baseball team. The ballfield is located at the corner of Hawkins Blvd. and Phoenix Drive.

Campuses

 Mission del Paso Campus: east El Paso/Mission Valley  
 Northwest Campus: northwest El Paso 
 Rio Grande Campus: downtown El Paso 
 Transmountain Campus: northeast El Paso 
 Valle Verde Campus: centrally located within the district, serves as EPCC's main campus

Other locations
Mission Early College High School—Socorro ISD 
Transmountain Early College High School—El Paso ISD 
Valle Verde Early College High School—Ysleta ISD 
Career Training Center—offers job training skills for displaced workers 
In addition, courses are offered at nearby Fort Bliss

References

External links

Official website

Two-year colleges in Texas
Universities and colleges in El Paso, Texas
Educational institutions established in 1972
Community colleges in Texas
Buildings and structures in El Paso, Texas
Baseball venues in Texas
Baseball venues in El Paso, Texas
El Paso Community College